Eumichthini is a tribe of beetles in the subfamily Cerambycinae, containing the following genera and species:

 Genus Eumichthus
 Eumichthus oedipus LeConte, 1873
 Genus Poecilobrium
 Poecilobrium chalybeum (LeConte, 1873)

References

Cerambycinae